The following is a list of notable deaths in March 2003.

Entries for each day are listed alphabetically by surname. A typical entry lists information in the following sequence:
 Name, age, country of citizenship at birth, subsequent country of citizenship (if applicable), reason for notability, cause of death (if known), and reference.

March 2003

1
Nadine Conner, 96, American operatic soprano, radio singer and music teacher.
Elaine Barrie, 87, American actress (Midnight), fourth wife of John Barrymore.
Franjo Glaser, 90, Croatian footballer.
Roger Needham, 68, British computer scientist, pioneered computer password one-way hash functions.
Countess Viktoria-Luise of Solms-Baruth, 81, German princess.

2
Roger Albertsen, 45, Norwegian footballer, cancer.
Hank Ballard, 66, American singer (The Midnighters), composer, famous for his hit "The Twist".
William Blezard, 81, English composer, accompanist/arranger for Noël Coward, Marlene Dietrich, Joyce Grenfell, Honor Blackman.
Joe Decker, 55, American baseball player (Chicago Cubs, Minnesota Twins, Seattle Mariners).
Sir George Edwards, 94, British aircraft designer.
Sir Ian Hogg, 91, British admiral.
Robert B. Ingebretsen, 54, pioneer in the development of digital sound.
Malcolm Williamson, 71, Australian composer, Master of the Queen's Music.
Bill Woggon, 87, American cartoonist who created the comic book Katy Keene.

3
Gilbert Wheeler Beebe, 90, American epidemiologist and statistician, conducted ground-breaking radiation exposure studies.
Ann A. Bernatitus, 91, American U.S. Navy nurse, Legion of Merit for heroism during the siege of Bataan and Corregidor.
Sir John Brown, 86, British publisher (Oxford University Press).
Horst Buchholz, 69, German actor (The Magnificent Seven, One, Two, Three, Life Is Beautiful).
Jack Dain, 90, British-born Australian Anglican prelate, Assistant Bishop of Sydney.
Dick Garrard, 92, Australian Olympic wrestler (silver medal in men's freestyle welterweight at the 1948 Summer Olympics).
John S. Gill, 70, Australian rules footballer.
Malcolm Kilduff, 75, American journalist.
Luis Marden, 90, American photographer, explorer, writer, and filmmaker.

4
Fedora Barbieri, 82, Italian operatic mezzo-soprano and actress.
Sébastien Japrisot, 71, French author, screenwriter and film director.
Lin Lanying, 85, Chinese electrical engineer, physicist, and politician.
Oliver Payne Pearson, 87, American zoologist and ecologist.
Amiya Pujari, 54, Indian computer scientist.
Neil Smith, 53, English cricketer.

5
Sir Hardy Amies, 93, English fashion designer, official dressmaker for Queen Elizabeth II.
Séamus de Brún, 91, Irish teacher, member of the Seanad and a promoter of Irish culture and language.
George Miller, 61, American stand-up comedian, leukemia.
Pete Taylor, 57, American sportscaster.
Dzhabrail Yamadayev, 32, Chechen rebel field commander, killed by a bomb.

6
Ernst B. Haas, 78, German-born American political scientist.
Mickey Kreitner, 80, American baseball player (Chicago Cubs).
Ramón Mestre, 65, Argentine politician.
Luděk Pachman, 78, Czechoslovak-German chess grandmaster, chess writer, and political activist.
John Sanford, 98, American screenwriter and author.
Hannah Semer, 78, Israeli journalist.

7
José Márcio Ayres, 49, Brazilian conservationist and zoologist, founded Brazilian rain forest reserves.
Monica Hughes, 77, Canadian science fiction author.
Al Libke, 84, American baseball player (Cincinnati Reds).
Sid Scales, 86, New Zealand cartoonist.

8
Cho Byung-hwa, 81, South Korean poet.
Adam Faith, 62, British singer and actor.
Stanisław Fołtyn, 66, Polish Olympic footballer.
Wallace M. Greene, 95, United States Marine Corps four-star general.
Elliott Jaques, 86, Canadian psychoanalyst and social scientist who coined the term "midlife crisis".
Mickey McGowan, 81, American baseball player (New York Giants).
Karen Morley, 93, American film actress and political activist; former wife of Charles Vidor.

9
Stan Brakhage, 70, American filmmaker, bladder cancer.
Tony Dornhorst, 87, British physician and medical educator.
Rolf Hagedorn, 83, German theoretical physicist.
Toni Mendez, 94, American agent for writers and cartoonists.
Sir Frederick Wood, 76, British businessman and industrialist (Croda International).

10
Víctor Alba, 86, Spanish writer and anti-communist, anti-capitalist political journalist.
Gennadi Afanasyev, 60, Russian football player and manager.
Tom Boardman, Baron Boardman, 84, British businessman and politician (MP for Leicester South West, Leicester South).
Lionel Frederick Dakers, 79, British cathedral organist.
Bernard Dowiyogo, 57, President of Nauru, cardiac complications from diabetes.
Geoffrey Kirk, 81, British classical scholar.
Barry Sheene, 52, British twice 500cc MotoGP Champion.
Naftali Temu, 57, Kenyan athlete, prostate cancer.
Ottorino Volonterio, 85, Swiss Formula One race car driver.
Nilufar Yasmin, 55, Bangladeshi singer, cancer.

11
Brian Cleeve, 81, Anglo-Irish writer.
Alta Cohen, 94, American baseball player (Brooklyn Robins/Dodgers, Philadelphia Phillies).
John G. Dow, 97, American politician (U.S. Representative for New York's 27th congressional district).
Ivar Hansen, 64, Danish politician and speaker of the Folketing.
Alec Harper, 92, British soldier and polo player.
Kevin Laffan, 80, British playwright and screenwriter (Emmerdale), pneumonia.
Kenneth G. Wilson, 79, American author (The Columbia Guide to Standard American English) and academic.
Wayne D. Wright, 86, American horse racing jockey, winner of all three Triple Crown races in different years.

12
Herb Banet, 89, American professional football player (Manchester University, Green Bay Packers).
Zoran Đinđić, 50, Prime Minister of Serbia, gunshot (assassination).
Alys Faiz, 87, Pakistani writer and human rights activist.
Howard Fast, 88, American novelist.
Andrey Kivilev, 29, Kazakhstani road bicycle racer (2001 Route du Sud, 2000 Olympics, 1996 Olympics), fall during Paris–Nice race.
Lynne Thigpen, 54, American television and Tony Award-winning stage actress (An American Daughter).

13
Lois Tobío Fernández, 96, Galician writer, translator and philologist.
Enriko Josif, 78, Serbian composer, pedagogue and musical writer.
Ian Samwell, 66, English musician, singer-songwriter and record producer.
Christiane Schmidtmer, 63, German actress, fashion model and nude model.
Gus Yatron, 75, American politician (U.S. Representative for Pennsylvania's 6th congressional district).

14
Harmon Craig, 76, American geochemist.
Amanda Davis, 32, American writer and teacher, plane crash.
Al Gionfriddo, 81, American baseball player (Pittsburgh Pirates, Brooklyn Dodgers).
Jack Goldstein, 57, American artist, suicide.
Ron Shoop, 71, American baseball player (Detroit Tigers).

15
Yevgeny Belyayev, 48, Soviet cross-country skier (Olympic medals: 1976 silver, 1976 bronze, 1980 gold).
Mari Bicknell, 89, English choreographer and ballet teacher.
Margaret Coit, 83, American writer.
Dame Thora Hird, 91, British actress, comedian, presenter and writer.
Bill Robertson, 79, British footballer.
Li Xuefeng, 96, Chinese politician.

16
Lawrence H. Aller, 89, American astronomer who studied the chemical composition of stars and nebulae.
George Bayer, 77, American professional golfer, won three PGA Tour events, known for his long drives.
Rachel Corrie, 23, American International Solidarity Movement activist, crushed by bulldozer.
Major Ronald Ferguson, 71, father of UK royal divorcée Sarah, Duchess of York.
Sir Davis Hughes, 92, Australian politician.
Teemu Raimoranta, 25, Finnish metal musician.

17
Herbert Aptheker, 87, American historian and political activist.
Terje Baalsrud, 88, Norwegian newspaper editor.
Thomas N. Barnes, 72, American Chief Master Sergeant of the Air Force.
Bill Carlisle, 94, American country music singer, songwriter and comedian.
Yvette Etiévant, 80, French actress.
Alan Keith, 84, British broadcaster.
Klaus Oldendorff, German Olympic sailor 
Robert Shelton, 73, American clansman.
Su Buqing, 100, Chinese mathematician.
Beatrice Wright, 92, American-British politician (Member of Parliament of the U.K. for Bodmin).

18
József Balla, 47, Hungarian wrestler (men's Olympic freestyle super-heavyweight wrestling: 1976 silver medal, 1980 silver medal).
Bruno Heim, 92, Swiss ecclesiastical diplomat, Apostolic Nuncio to Britain.
Karl Kling, 92, German racing driver.
Adam Osborne, 64, computer pioneer (Osborne 1).
Monk Williams, 58, American professional football player (Cincinnati Bengals).

19
Joe Buzas, 83, American baseball player (New York Yankees) and minor league baseball team owner.
Hiromichi Fuyuki, 42, Japanese professional wrestler and promoter.
Émile Genest, 81, Canadian actor, heart attack.
Olivier Long, 87, Swiss Ambassador and the director-general of the GATT.
Emily Muir, 99, American painter, architect and philanthropist.
Michael Mathias Prechtl, 76, German illustrator.
Nancy Farley Wood, 99, American physicist and business owner, member of the Manhattan Project.

20
Al Blades, 26, American professional football player (University of Miami, San Francisco 49ers), car accident.
Krishanu Dey, 41, Indian football player, pulmonary disorder.
Sailor Art Thomas, 79, American professional wrestler, cancer.
Richard W. Vollmer Jr., 77, American judge (U.S. District Judge of the U.S. District Court for the Southern District of Alabama).

21
Wesley Balk, 70, American opera artistic director (Minnesota Opera), professor of theater arts and writer.
Harry Eisenstat, 87, American baseball player (Brooklyn Dodgers, Detroit Tigers, Cleveland Indians).
Leonard Hokanson, 71, American pianist, pancreatic cancer.
Shivani, 79, Indian writer.
Umar Wirahadikusumah, 78, Indonesian fourth Vice President, served from 1983 to 1988.

22
Jim Anderson, 59, Australian politician.
Amado Cortez, 75, Filipino actor and diplomat.
Terry Lloyd, 50, British ITN reporter, killed in southern Iraq.
Paul Moran, 39, Australian photojournalist, killed by suicide bomb in Northern Iraq.

23
Hideyo Amamoto, 77, Japanese actor, complications from pneumonia.
Dave Dallwitz, 88,  Australian jazz musician and painter.
Wolf-Eberhard von Lewinski, 75, German music and theatre critic.
Tage Nielsen, 74, Danish composer, teacher and music administrator.
Lori Piestewa, 23, United States Army soldier, head wounds received during ambush.

24
Jan-Just Bos, 63, Dutch rower (bronze medal in men's coxed pair rowing at the 1964 Summer Olympics).
John Cavanagh, 88, Irish couturier.
Hans Hermann Groër, 83, former Roman Catholic Archbishop of Vienna (1986–1995), pneumonia.
Don Raffell, 83, American musician and educator.
Brandi Wells, 47, American singer, songwriter and entertainer, breast cancer.
Philip Yordan, 88, American screenwriter, won Academy Award for Best Story for Broken Lance in 1954.

25
Robert W. Allard, 83, American plant geneticist, founded the field of plant population genetics.
Christopher French, 77, British barrister and judge.
Masato Furuoya, 45, Japanese actor, suicide by hanging.
John Michael Hooker, 49, American serial killer, execution by lethal injection.
Michael Kidron, 72, revolutionary thinker and cartographer.

26
Yisroel Moshe Dushinsky, 81, second rebbe of Jerusalem, Israel.
Marcus Kaufman, 73, American politician, renal failure.
Daniel Patrick Moynihan, 76, American politician, sociologist, and diplomat, complications following an appendectomy.
Babatunji Olowofoyeku, 85, Nigerian politician, educationist and lawyer.
Tauese Sunia, 61, Governor of American Samoa, heart attack.
Rolf Thomsen, 87, U-boat commander in the Kriegsmarine during World War II.
Dorothy Clarke Wilson, 98, American writer, wrote Prince of Egypt, which was primary source for The Ten Commandments.

27
Jeremiah Duggan, 22, British student, traffic accident.
Edouard Masengo,69/70, Congolese guitarist.
Chris Michie, 55, guitarist and composer and best known for his work with Van Morrison, malignant melanoma.
Elisa Mújica, 85, Colombian writer.
Paul Zindel, 66, American playwright (The Effect of Gamma Rays on Man-in-the-Moon Marigolds), lung cancer.

28
Kadri Aytaç, 71, Turkish football player and then manager, Alzheimer's disease.
Sam Bowens, 65, American baseball player (Baltimore Orioles, Washington Senators).
Rusty Draper, 80, American country and pop singer, pneumonia.
Pat Kelly, 37, American football player, cancer.
Sir Kenneth Porter, 90, British air marshal.
L. B. G. Rao, 81, Indian politician.

29
Placide Adams, 73, American string bass player, drummer and vocalist.
Neil Clarke, 45, Australian footballer.
Matthew J. Ryan, 70, American politician.
Maude Storey, 73, British nursing administrator, diabetes.
Dr. Carlo Urbani, 46, World Health Organization doctor who discovered SARS, SARS.

30
Andy Barr, 89, Northern Irish trade unionist (chairman of Communist Party of Ireland, president of Irish Congress of Trade Unions).
Bruno Boni, 87, Italian rower (bronze medal in men's coxless pair at the 1948 Summer Olympics).
David Cook, 73/74, British literary critic.
Nick Enright, 52, Australian dramatist, playwright and theatre director, melanoma.
Michael Jeter, 50, American actor (Evening Shade, Waterworld, Jurassic Park III), epilepsy
Sir Gregor MacGregor, 6th Baronet, 77, Scottish clan chief and army officer.
Valentin Pavlov, 65, former Prime Minister of the Soviet Union.
Gaby Rado, 48, Hungarian-born activist and  UK-based journalist.
Patricia Vinnicombe, 71, South African-Australian archaeologist and art preservationist (San rock art, Australian Aboriginal art).

31
Lucian Adams, 80, American U.S. Army World War II soldier who received the Medal of Honor.
Charly Bouvy, 60, Belgian bobsledder and field hockey player (1964 bobsleigh, 1968 field hockey, 1972 field hockey).
George Connor, 78, American football player (Notre Dame, Chicago Bears), member of the Pro Football Hall of Fame.
Harold Scott MacDonald Coxeter, 96, UK/Canadian geometer, academic and author.
Sidney Greenberg, 85, American rabbi and author.
Fermín Vélez, 43, Spanish sports car racing driver, two-time 12 Hours of Sebring winner, two-time Group C2 champion.

References 

2003-03
 03